C71 may refer to :
 Honda C71, C76, C72, C77 Dream, motorcycle different models
 Brain tumor ICD-10 code
 Ruy Lopez, chess openings ECO code
 Caldwell 71 (NGC 2477), an open cluster in the constellation Puppis

C-71 may refer to :
 C-71 (Michigan county highway)
 C-71 Executive, an aircraft